Sylvia Shi (born July 24, 1988) is an American multi national champion and world champion in duplicate bridge.

Career 
Shi started playing bridge in 2011 when she picked it up over learning to fly planes as a much-needed new hobby after a break-up. While she is well-versed in many systems, she has a fondness for playing TOSR (transfer-oriented systemic relay), a form of Precision Club.  Shi became a Grand Life Master in December 2019 at the San Francisco NABC.

Shi has now admitted to cheating at online bridge through self-kibitzing and has been suspended by the American Contract Bridge League pending a misconduct hearing.

Bridge accomplishments

Wins

 Grand National Teams Flight C 2012, Flight A 2016
 Lebhar IMP Pairs 2015
 NABC+ Mixed Swiss Teams 2015
 Sternberg Women's Board-a-Match Teams 2016
 10K Mixed Swiss Teams 2016
 Torlontano Trophy 2016
 Smith Life Master Women's Pairs 2017

Runners-up
 Edgar Kaplan Blue Ribbon Pairs 2017
 Grand National Teams 2018

References

External links
 

1988 births
American contract bridge players
Living people